Stenella deightoniana is a species of anamorphic fungi.

References

External links

deightoniana
Fungi described in 2005